Emanuel Cvjetićanin (August 8, 1833 – 1919) was an Austro-Hungarian Feldmarschalleutnant, a rank equivalent to Major General.

Biography
Emanuel Cvjetićanin, whose baptismal name was Manojlo, was born in the municipality of Rakovica, formerly the Slunj municipality. He had received his baptismal name from his father Alexander austrian officer born in Sadilovac 1807 and mother Vasilija Trbuhović, a Serb of Orthodox faith. The Cvjetićanin family belonged to an old Serbian family line, originating from the Raškan Bogunović tribe, who inhabited the northern parts of Montenegro, Dubrovnik, Herzegovina, northern Dalmatia, and Lika. Later, the tribe divided into several families, such as Bundalo, Kovačević, Cvjetićanin and others. He would attend the Theresian Military Academy, and later the family would move to Udbina in Lika.

During the Austrian occupation of Bosnia and Herzegovina, which lasted from 1878 to 1882, Cvjetićanin was the main organizer of the gendarmerie in Sarajevo. He received numerous decorations, including the Order of Maria Theresa, with which he received the title of baron, the "Knight's Cross", and the Military Merit Cross. He was the first adjutant of Emperor Franz Josef I and was in a second car behind of the Archduke Franz Ferdinand in Sarajevo when Gavrilo Princip assassinated him. King Alexander I of Yugoslavia offered him a post as one of his Field Marshals, but he declined the offer.

Emanuel's wife was Sofia Cvjetićanin, née Krivacić, and with her he had only one son, Milan Cvetičanin. Milan would end up changing his surname from Cvjetićanin to Cvetičanin, following a misunderstanding with his father, and move to Belgrade, where he had been transferred to the Serbian army as an Austrian officer under Živojin Mišić. As a Serbian administrative sub-officer, he would later end up dying on 6 October 1917, alongside 21 other soldiers, in Saint-Mandrier-sur-Mer near Toulon in France. Cvjetićanin died in Zagreb later in 1919 and was buried at Mirogoj Cemetery.

During the Second World War, a large number of members within Emanuel's wider family would perish as a result of the crimes of the Ustashe. On 31 July 1942, in the Church of the Holy Virgin in Sadilovac, they were slaughtered and subsequently burnt. On the same day, 27 members of the Cvjetićanin family  were also slaughtered and burnt in a mill of six wings. Emanuel had often visited his relatives in Sadilovac and had personally bought them the aforementioned mill on the Korana river.

Personal life

Emanuel had a single wife, Sofia Cvjetićanin, with whom he had one child, named Milan.

Milan himself would marry two women; first Milica Birčanin Cvetičanin with whom he would have four children and later Dara Cvetičanin with whom he had two children.

See also
 Military Order of Maria Theresa

References

Further reading

External links
 Ancestry - Re:Zec or Cveticanin (Serbian Only)

1833 births
1919 deaths
People from Udbina
Austro-Hungarian Serbs
Knights Cross of the Military Order of Maria Theresa
Commanders Cross of the Military Order of Maria Theresa